Thomas Barham may refer to:

Thomas Foster Barham (musician) (1766–1844), English musician and miscellaneous writer
Thomas Foster Barham (physician) (1794–1869), English physician and classical scholar